Ben's Cookies is an international chain of shops that bake and sell cookies. After making cookies at home, Helge Rubinstein opened a stall to sell them in Oxford's Covered Market in 1984. The cookies can usually be purchased warm as they are baked on-site in the shops. The first store was in Oxford's covered market. The stores are mainly in London, but also in other UK cities, New York and other countries.

The company was named after Rubinstein's son Ben, and the logo was created by the British artist Quentin Blake, a friend of the family.

Ben's Cookies currently has numerous stores in the United Kingdom, including Bath, Bristol, Cambridge, Edinburgh, London, and Reading. It has also opened stores overseas in South Korea, Japan, Saudi Arabia, Dubai, Kuwait, Bangkok and Manila.

References

External links
 Official website

Retail companies established in 1983
Catering and food service companies of the United Kingdom